Gauthier is a township municipality in Timiskaming District the Northeastern Ontario, Canada. The township had a population of 138 in the Canada 2016 Census.

History
Dobie housed the miners working the Upper Canada Mines, which produced 4,648,984 ounces of gold before closing in 1971.

Demographics 

Mother tongue (2006):
 English as first language: 85%
 French as first language: 7.5%
 English and French as first language: 7.5%
 Other as first language: 0%

Transportation
Gauthier is served by two provincial highways:
Ontario Highway 66 running west to Kirkland Lake and Ontario Highway 11, and east to the Quebec border, where it continues as Quebec Route 117. Highway 66 is part of the Trans-Canada Highway between highway 11 and the Quebec border.
Ontario Highway 672, running north from Highway 66 past Northlands Park to Esker Lakes Provincial Park and then to Ontario Highway 101.

The township is traversed in an east–west direction by the Nipissing Central Railway line that runs between Swastika (Ontario) and Rouyn-Noranda (Quebec). The line continues to be operated, as a subsidiary of the Ontario Northland Railway, as a freight spur.

Notable people
Actress Sara Botsford was born in Dobie.

See also
List of townships in Ontario
List of francophone communities in Ontario

References

External links

Municipalities in Timiskaming District
Single-tier municipalities in Ontario
Township municipalities in Ontario